The Statue of Lenin in Bila Tserkva (in Ukrainian: Пам'ятник В.І.Леніну) was a sculpture monument to Vladimir Lenin, located in Bila Tserkva, Ukraine. It was built in 1983. The monument ID is 32-103-0093.

It was destroyed and dismantled during the Euromaidan Protests.

See also 
 Demolition of monuments to Vladimir Lenin in Ukraine
 List of statues of Vladimir Lenin

References

External links 
 

Destroyed sculptures
Statues in Ukraine
Demolished buildings and structures in Ukraine
Sculptures in the Soviet Union
Buildings and structures demolished in 2014
Monuments and memorials to Vladimir Lenin
Decommunization in Ukraine
1983 establishments in Ukraine
2014 disestablishments in Ukraine
Outdoor sculptures in Ukraine
Sculptures of men in Ukraine
Removed statues
Statues removed in 2014